Syrians in Jordan include migrants from Syria to Jordan, as well as their descendants. The number of Syrian refugees in Jordan is estimated at around 662,010 people registered as of July 2019,. The number of Syrians (including non-refugees) stands at 1.266 million, according to the 2015 Population and Housing Census .

Syrian refugees in Jordan are formed of various ethnic and religious groups. The majority are Arabs (including Palestinians), Syrian Turkmen and Syrian Kurds.

See also
 Jordan–Syria relations
 List of Syrian refugee camps in Jordan
 Palestinians in Jordan
 Refugees of the Syrian Civil War
 Refugees of the Syrian Civil War in Jordan
 Syrian diaspora
 Syrians in Lebanon
 Syrian refugee camps

References

Arabs in Jordan
 
Ethnic groups in Jordan
Middle Eastern diaspora in Jordan
Jordan
Refugees of the Arab Winter
Refugees of the Syrian civil war